The 1952 Ireland rugby union tour of South America, was a series of rugby matches played in Chile and Argentina. This tour by the Ireland national rugby union team coincided with the death of Eva Peron, the wife of Juan Peron, the President of Argentina. As a result, it was almost cancelled. Eva Peron died on 26 July, six days after the Irish squad had departed Dublin. However, after playing their first game in Santiago, Chile, the team travelled onto Buenos Aires and completed the tour as planned.

They finished with a record of played 9, won 6, drew 2 and 1 defeat. The tour also featured the first full rugby internationals between Ireland and Argentina.

Touring party
Manager: G.P.S. Hogan
Secretary: R.W. Jeffares, Jr
Referee: O.B. Glasgow
Captain: Des O’Brien

Backs
 M. Birthistle (Old Belvedere)
 Richard Chambers (Instonians)
 Robin Gregg (Queen's University)
 William Hewitt (Instonians)
 Michael Hillary (University College Dublin)
 J.T. Horgan (University College Cork)
 Mick Lane (University College Cork)
 John Notley (Wanderers)
 John O'Meara (University College Cork)

Forwards
Fuzzy Anderson (Queen's University)
D. Crowley (Cork Constitution)
Michael Dargan (Old Belvedere)
James Ronald Kavanagh (University College Dublin)
Patrick Kavanagh (University College Dublin)
Des O'Brien (Cardiff)
Archie O'Leary (Cork Constitution)
W.J. O'Neill (University College Dublin)
Patrick Lawlor (Clontarf)
Jim McCarthy (Dolphin)
John H. Smith (Collegians)
P.P. Traynor (Clontarf)

Match details

First test

Second test

References

1952
1952
1952
1952 rugby union tours
1952 in Argentine sport
History of rugby union matches between Argentina and Ireland
Five Nations